Jintai Xizhao station is a subway station on Line 10 of the Beijing Subway. It is located along East 3rd Ring Road Middle between China National Highway 102, known as Chaoyangmen Outer Street to the west of the 3rd Ring Road and Chaoyang Road to the east, and Guanghua Road.

Name 

The name originated from one of the Eight Sights of Yanjing. Jintai Xizhao literally means The Golden Terrace in the Glow of the Setting Sun. In 2002, a stone tablet of Jintai Xizhao written by Qianlong Emperor was unearthed under the Jingguang Building. The stone tablet was placed near the building now. The Beijing Subway station was named after the stone tablet when the first phase of Line 10 was opened in 2008.

Station layout 
The station has an underground island platform.

Exits 
There are 4 exits, lettered A, B, C, and D. Exits A and B are accessible.

References

External links

Beijing Subway stations in Chaoyang District
Railway stations in China opened in 2008